Richard Gordon "Rich" Kromm (born March 29, 1964) is a Canadian-born American former professional ice hockey left winger who played for the Calgary Flames and the New York Islanders.

Biography
Born in Trail, British Columbia, Kromm was raised in Dallas, Texas; Winnipeg, Manitoba; and Detroit, Michigan, while his father coached different professional teams. In minor hockey in Winnipeg, Richard played on a line with future NHL star, Brett Hull, whose dad, Bobby, played for the Winnipeg Jets (Rich's dad, Bobby Kromm, was the coach of the Jets). Kromm and Hull played together in the 1977 Quebec International Pee-Wee Hockey Tournament with the Winnipeg South Monarchs minor ice hockey team. Kromm was drafted in the 1982 NHL Entry Draft by the Flames with the 37th overall pick.

Kromm made his NHL debut on November 29, 1983 against the Philadelphia Flyers. In that game he got an assist. His final NHL season was 1992–93. He only played one game that year, but in that game he scored a goal and 2 assists, raising his points per game average to 3.00 for the season. This is a NHL record for single season point per game average which Kromm shares with Bill Kyle who also achieved the average in a single game during 1950–51 NHL season.

On August 8, 2007, Kromm became the head coach of the Portland Winter Hawks. Kromm played with the team from 1981 to 1984. He is a former captain for the Winter Hawks, playing in 142 regular-season games, recording 62 goals and 110 assists. In 28 playoff games, he had seven goals and 16 assists.  He played on the 1982–83 Memorial Cup champion team, scoring 35 goals with 68 assists during the regular season. He is the former head coach of the Evansville IceMen hockey team of the ECHL. On July 15, 2013, Kromm was named the head coach and director of hockey operations for the Stockton Thunder, an ECHL affiliate of one of his former NHL clubs, the New York Islanders.

Kromm's daughter Erica played professional ice hockey for the Calgary Inferno in the Canadian Women's Hockey League before the league's collapse. Appearing with the Inferno in the 2016 Clarkson Cup finals, she registered a +2 rating as the Inferno emerged victorious in a convincing 8-3 final. She is now a member of the PWHPA.

Career statistics

References

External links
Hockey Draft Central

1964 births
American men's ice hockey left wingers
Calgary Flames draft picks
Calgary Flames players
Calgary Hitmen coaches
Canadian ice hockey left wingers
Capital District Islanders players
Chicago Blackhawks scouts
Ice hockey people from British Columbia
Ice hockey people from Texas
Leksands IF players
Living people
New York Islanders players
Portland Winterhawks coaches
Portland Winterhawks players
Sportspeople from Dallas
Sportspeople from Trail, British Columbia
Springfield Indians players
Canadian expatriate ice hockey players in Sweden